Tovaritch is a 1935 French comedy film directed by Jacques Deval, Germain Fried, Jean Tarride and Victor Trivas. It starred Iréne Zilahy, André Lefaur and Marguerite Deval. It is based on the 1933 play Tovarich by Jacques Deval. In 1930s Paris two exiled Russian aristocrats take jobs as domestic servants.

Cast
 André Lefaur : General Mikhaïl Ouratieff
 Irène Zilahy : Tatiana Ouratieff
 André Alerme : Mr Arbeziah
 Pierre Renoir : Gorotchenko
 Pierre Palau : L'hôtelier
 Marguerite Deval : Mme Arbeziah
 Junie Astor : Augustine
 Jean Forest : Georges
 Germaine Michel : La cusinière
 Ariane Borg : Hélène
 Georges Mauloy : Chauffourier-Dubief
 Wina Winfried : Lady Carrigan
 Camille Bert : Comte Breginsky
 Gabrielle Calvi
 Laman
 Fabienne Orfiz
 Louis-Ferdinand Céline : Un figurant

Bibliography
 Alonso, Harriet Hyman. Robert E. Sherwood: The Playwright in Peace and War. University of Massachusetts Press, 2007.

External links

1935 films
French comedy films
1930s French-language films
French films based on plays
Films based on works by Jacques Deval
Films set in Paris
1935 comedy films
French black-and-white films
1930s French films